USS LST-916 was an  in the United States Navy. Like many of her class, she was not named and is properly referred to by her hull designation.

Construction
LST-916 was laid down on 22 March 1944, at Hingham, Massachusetts, by the Bethlehem-Hingham Shipyard; launched on 29 April 1944; and commissioned on 25 May 1944.

Service history
During World War II, LST-916 was assigned to the Asiatic-Pacific theater and participated in the Leyte landings in October 1944, the Lingayen Gulf landings in January 1845, and the assault and occupation of Okinawa Gunto in April 1945.

Following the war, LST-916 performed occupation duty in the Far East until mid-November 1945. She was decommissioned on 5 April 1946, and transferred to the US Army on 28 June, that same year. On 29 September 1947, she was struck from the Navy list; and, on 4 October 1948, LST-916 was lost in typhoon Libby near Naha Reef, near Naha, Okinawa.

Awards
LST-916 earned three battle star for World War II service.

Notes

Citations

Bibliography 

Online resources
 
 
 
Printed resources

External links
 

 

LST-542-class tank landing ships
World War II amphibious warfare vessels of the United States
Ships built in Hingham, Massachusetts
1944 ships
Maritime incidents in 1948